In statistics, the inverse matrix gamma distribution is a generalization of the inverse gamma distribution to positive-definite matrices. It is a more general version of the inverse Wishart distribution, and is used similarly, e.g. as the conjugate prior of the covariance matrix of a multivariate normal distribution or matrix normal distribution.  The compound distribution resulting from compounding a matrix normal with an inverse matrix gamma prior over the covariance matrix is a generalized matrix t-distribution.

This reduces to the inverse Wishart distribution with   degrees of freedom when .

See also 
 inverse Wishart distribution.
 matrix gamma distribution.
 matrix normal distribution.
 matrix t-distribution.
 Wishart distribution.

References 

Random matrices
Continuous distributions
Multivariate continuous distributions